Route 319 is a state highway in northern Connecticut running entirely in Stafford.

Route description
Route 319 begins at an intersection with Route 190 in Stafford and heads east and northeast, crossing Furnace Brook and ending at an intersection with Route 19 in Stafford Hollow. The entire route is known as Orcuttville Road.

History
Orcuttville Road was first designated as a state highway in the 1962 Route Reclassification Act. It was initially assigned as SR 535, an unsigned internal route number. In 1967, the internal route number was changed to SR 611. Route 319 was established from SR 611 as a signed route in 1988 and has had no significant changes since. In 2010, a curve just east of the Route 32 intersection was reconstructed in front of the town's high school to take out the sharp curve that had originally been there, which placed the road slightly north of where it had originally been. The length of Route 319, however, has not been changed.

Junction list

References

External links

319
Transportation in Tolland County, Connecticut